Millennium station is a current rapid-transit stop and a future OC Transpo Transitway Station located in the Orleans area of Ottawa, Ontario, Canada, just south of the intersection of Innes Road and Trim Road. Officially opening in September 2007, it is the easternmost station in Ottawa's bus rapid transit system and it serves as the eastern terminus of routes 25, 30 and 39. It is also located just southwest of École secondaire Gisèle-Lalonde.

The station first appeared in OC Transpo's route network as part of their September 2, 2007 service change. In addition to the new stop, the City of Ottawa approved the construction of a park and ride facility and bus station, which officially opened in 2009.

Millennium is expected to be the eastern terminus of a future Transitway segment that would connect to Blair station by 2031.

Service

The following routes serve Millennium:

Notes 

 Route  doesn't serve this station during the late evenings on weekdays or in the evenings on weekends.
 Route  doesn't serve this station during the late evenings on weekdays.

See also
 Ottawa Rapid Transit
 OC Transpo Routes
 O-Train

References

External links
 OC Transpo System Map

2007 establishments in Ontario
Transitway (Ottawa) stations